Abdel Rahman Magdy Sobhi Mohamed (born 12 September 1997), is an Egyptian footballer who plays for Egyptian Premier League side Ismaily and the Egyptian national team as a winger.

International
He made his debut for the Egypt national football team on 23 March 2019 in an Africa Cup qualifier against Niger, as a 68th-minute substitute for Amar Hamdy.

Honours

Egypt
Africa U-23 Cup of Nations Champions: 2019

References

External links

1997 births
Living people
Egyptian footballers
Egypt international footballers
Association football wingers
Egyptian Premier League players
Tersana SC players
Ismaily SC players
Footballers at the 2020 Summer Olympics
Olympic footballers of Egypt